The Rohrbachstein is a mountain of the Bernese Alps, located on the border between the Swiss cantons of Bern and Valais. It lies between the Rawil Pass and the Plaine Morte Glacier.

References

External links
 Rohrbachstein on Hikr

Mountains of the Alps
Mountains of Switzerland
Mountains of the canton of Bern
Mountains of Valais
Bern–Valais border
Two-thousanders of Switzerland